In Zambia some roads are designated as numbered routes to help with navigation. There is a nationwide numbering scheme consisting of Trunk Roads (also known as Inter-Territorial Roads), Main Roads (also known as Territorial Roads) and District Roads. 

Current Roads

Total: 91,440 km (2001)  
Paved: 20,117 km (2001) of which 6,779 km are trunk or main routes. 
Unpaved: 71,323 km (2001) (Some of the unpaved highways are graded laterite roads.)

Every Trunk Road, together with many Main Roads and very-few District Roads, are designated as Toll roads. The tollgates are administered by the National Road Fund Agency (NRFA) and the Road Development Agency (RDA).

In October 2022, at a symposium was dubbed “Sustainable infrastructure development using cement and concrete technologies, Road Development Agency (RDA), Chilanga Cement, Dangote Limited and Bari Zambia Limited signed an agreement to partner on the development of concrete roads across the country.

Trunk Roads
Trunk roads are mainly known as Inter-Territotial Roads. They are the main routes used to connect Zambia with other countries. They are designated with a letter T followed by a number from 1 to 6.

Main Roads
Main roads are mainly known as Territorial Roads. They are the main routes connecting different towns of Zambia in areas where there is no Inter-Territorial (Trunk) Road. They are designated with an M followed by a number from 1 to 20.

District Roads

District roads are roads connecting rural areas to the Territorial (Main) roads & Inter-Territorial (Trunk) roads. They are designated with a D followed by a two or three digit number.

References